Dysdercus bimaculatus, the two-spotted cotton stainer, is a species of red bug in the family Pyrrhocoridae. It is found in Central America, North America, and South America.

References

Pyrrhocoridae
Articles created by Qbugbot
Insects described in 1854